Joshua Winckowski (born June 28, 1998) is an American professional baseball pitcher for the Boston Red Sox of Major League Baseball (MLB).

Career

Toronto Blue Jays
Winckowski is from Toledo, Ohio. He attended Toledo Mud Hens games at Fifth Third Field as a child, but moved to Florida for high school. Winckowski attended Estero High School in Estero, Florida. The Toronto Blue Jays selected him in the 15th round of the 2016 MLB draft. Winckowski played in the Blue Jays' farm system from 2016 through 2019, reaching the Class A-Advanced level with the Dunedin Blue Jays. In four seasons with the Toronto organization, Winckowski made 54 appearances (50 starts), compiling an 18–17 win–loss record with a 3.35 earned run average (ERA).

Boston Red Sox
On January 27, 2021, Winckowski was traded to the New York Mets alongside Yennsy Díaz and Sean Reid-Foley in exchange for Steven Matz. On February 10, 2021, Winckowski was traded to the Boston Red Sox with Franchy Cordero and three players to be named later in a three-team trade, where the Kansas City Royals acquired Andrew Benintendi and the Mets received Khalil Lee. Winckowski began the 2021 season in Double-A with the Portland Sea Dogs and was promoted late in the season to the Triple-A Worcester Red Sox. Overall with both teams, he appeared in 23 games (22 starts), compiling a 3.94 ERA and 9–4 record while striking out 101 batters in 112 innings. After the regular season, Winckowski was selected to play for the Scottsdale Scorpions of the Arizona Fall League. On November 19, in advance of the Rule 5 draft, the Red Sox added Winckowski to their 40-man roster.

Winckowski began the 2022 season with Worcester. The Red Sox activated him on May 28 to start the second game of a doubleheader against the Baltimore Orioles at Fenway Park. Winckowski allowed four runs on six hits in three innings, taking the loss. He was returned to Worcester the following day. Winckowski was next recalled for a start on June 15, and registered his first MLB win after pitching five scoreless innings in a 10–1 victory over the Oakland Athletics at Fenway. Winckowski remained in the starting rotation until being placed on the COVID-related list on July 14; he rejoined the team on July 26. Through the remainder of the season, he split time between Worcester and Boston. In 15 games (14 starts) with Boston, Winckowski posted a 5–7 record with 5.89 ERA while striking out 44 batters in  innings.

References

External links

1998 births
Living people
Sportspeople from Toledo, Ohio
Baseball players from Ohio
American expatriate baseball people in Canada
Major League Baseball pitchers
Boston Red Sox players
Gulf Coast Blue Jays players
Bluefield Blue Jays players
Vancouver Canadians players
Lansing Lugnuts players
Dunedin Blue Jays players
Portland Sea Dogs players
Worcester Red Sox players
Scottsdale Scorpions players